Remaja may refer to:

Kadet Remaja Sekolah Malaysia, scout-like movement organized by the Government of Malaysia as a youth organisation
Komik Remaja, Malaysian manga magazine with manga and occasionally manhwa translated into Bahasa Malaysia
RISKA – Remaja Islam Sunda Kelapa, Islamic youth organization located in Jakarta, Indonesia

id:Remaja
ms:Remaja